Allatini is the name of a historic flour milling company, founded in 1858 by Moses Allatini and his brother, in Thessaloniki, Greece.  

The company had two industry sectors; ceramic production in Charilaou and flour mills in Kalamaria.

In the late 19th century, the Allatini family founded the famous Allatini flour-mills, in a large industrial area of the city, near Kalamaria. During the next decades the company was expanded, and in the 1930s the mills were the biggest in the Balkans.

Since then, the company's ownership changed many times, but preserving its historic name. Today it is owned by ELBISCO Group and is notable for its biscuits. Its new industrial facilities are located in Sindos.

Sources
Allatini Mills
ELBISCO

Manufacturing companies based in Thessaloniki
Greek brands
Companies established in 1858
Jews and Judaism in Thessaloniki
Ottoman Thessalonica
1858 establishments in the Ottoman Empire
Greek companies established in the 19th century